Juan Trejo (12 May 1927 – 6 November 2012) was a Mexican water polo player. He competed in the men's tournament at the 1952 Summer Olympics.

References

External links
 

1927 births
2012 deaths
Mexican male water polo players
Olympic water polo players of Mexico
Water polo players at the 1952 Summer Olympics
20th-century Mexican people